Kenneth Lerer is an American businessman and a media executive. He was the chairman and co-founder of The Huffington Post, an American news website acquired by Aol in 2011. Lerer is also a managing director of Lerer Hippeau Ventures, and chairman of Betaworks and BuzzFeed.

Career

Lerer is a past Executive Vice President of AOL Time Warner and was a founding partner of New York-based corporate communications firm Robinson, Lerer, and Montgomery.

In January 2010, Lerer and his son began a seed stage venture capital fund, Lerer Hippeau Ventures.

Lerer has taught at the Columbia University Graduate School of Journalism, the University of Pennsylvania, and New York University, where he lectured on the media and American corporations.  He served as Chairman of the Public Theater in New York for 10 years, and is now its Chairman Emeritus.

In June 2019, he announced he would step down as chairman of BuzzFeed after ten years at the company.

Personal life

Lerer is married to interior designer Katherine Sailer.

Ken Lerer has two children. His son, Benjamin, started Thrillist, an online men's lifestyle website, and is also a managing director at Lerer Hippeau Ventures. His daughter, Izzie, is founder and CEO of The Dodo, a digital media company for people who care about animals.

Lerer is one of the minority owners of the New York Mets, holding a 4% stake in the baseball team.

Politics

In 2013, Lerer launched StoptheNRA.com to advocate for the continuation of the assault weapons ban as a federal law.  He subsequently donated the website to the Brady Campaign to Prevent Gun Violence.

References

Living people
Year of birth missing (living people)
People from New York City
Columbia University faculty
New York University faculty
University of Pennsylvania faculty
21st-century American businesspeople
HuffPost
American media executives